Hanna (Hannah) Helena (Helen) Chrzanowska (7 October 1902 – 29 April 1973) was a Polish Roman Catholic who served as a nurse and was also a Benedictine oblate. Chrzanowska worked as a nurse during World War II when the Nazi regime targeted Poles but she tended to the wounded and the ailing throughout the conflict and sought to minimize suffering in her own parish. Chrzanowska was awarded two prestigious Polish awards for her good works and died in 1973 after an almost decade-long bout with cancer.

Her cause of sainthood commenced over a decade after her death and she was titled as a Servant of God on 28 April 1997. Pope Francis declared her to be venerable on 30 September 2015 upon the confirmation of her heroic virtue and later approved her beatification in mid-2017; Chrzanowska was beatified on 28 April 2018 in Poland.

Life
Hanna Helena Chrzanowska was born on 7 October 1902 in Warsaw to Ignacy Chrzanowski (5 February 1866 – 19 January 1940) and Wanda Szlenkier; her brother was Bogden Karol Chrzanowski. She was part of an industrialist (maternal side) and a land-owning household (paternal side) that maintained a long-standing tradition of charitable works; her parents were well known for this in their native Poland. Her home's religious circumstances were also quite unique since half were Roman Catholic and the other half was Protestant (descended from the Jauch house). Chrzanowska was a relative of the Nobel laureate Henryk Sienkiewicz (on her father's side) who was best known for writing the novel Quo Vadis.

Her maternal grandfather Karol set up a technical school for aspiring artisans while his wife Maria set up a health center for poor children in Warsaw. Her maternal aunt Zofia Szlenkier was known for her philanthropic efforts and in 1913 founded a children's hospital named after Maria and Karol. Since her childhood she suffered from respiratory and immune system deficiencies and spent a great deal of time in hospitals and sanatoriums in order to recover from such ailments. As a child she once noticed a boy alongside her in hospital whose clothes were so worn out to the point they were thrown out. But that meant the boy had no clothes he could wear to return home. So she arranged to present him with a new set of clothes much to his delight. In 1910 the family relocated from Warsaw to Kraków.

Chrzanowska – a curious and exuberant individual – attended an Ursuline high school in her adolescence and graduated with honors. During the Bolshevik Revolution she tended to the wounded soldiers and later commenced her studies at the School of Nursing in Warsaw in 1920. Sometime in the 1920s she suffered an arm injury and was required to have an operation. It was also around this stage that she worked under Magdalena Maria Epstein. Before she was admitted into nursing school she volunteered at a clinic for six months but was assigned bookkeeping duties that did not appeal to her for she wanted to be with people. She gained a scholarship to a nursing school in France in 1925 while later going on to work with the members of the U.S. Red Cross as a nurse in a time when the profession was not so well respected. Chrzanowska also travelled to Belgium to observe the nursing profession there as part of her education so as to gain greater experience and broader knowledge of the field. During her time as a nurse she became a leading light in the field in her region and became a well known face in her local area due to her temperance and her good works amongst the people whom she was dedicated to serving. Chrzanowska became an instructor at the University School of Nurses and Hygienists in Krakow from 1926 until 1929 and also served as the editor of the monthly publication "Nurse Poland" from 1929 to 1939. She also worked to help form the Catholic Association of Polish Nurses in 1937.

She became a member of the Benedictine oblate due to being drawn to Benedict of Nursia and aspiring to follow his example and the message of the gospel in an effort to draw closer to God; she also wanted to fuse her faith with her work as merciful and charitable work.

In 1940 during World War II she lost her father who died during the Sonderaktion Krakau at the Sachsenhausen concentration camp and her lieutenant brother Bogden died at the hands of Soviet soldiers on the orders of Joseph Stalin in the Katyn massacre. As the war continued she organized nurses for home care in Warsaw and helped to both feed and resettle refugees. At the conclusion of the war she became the head of a nursing home where she attended to administrative duties and cared for residents while working with nursing students. Chrzanowska also served as the director of the School of Psychiatric Nursing in Kobierzyn until the Communists closed it. After sometime she moved into nursing the poor and the neglected in her own parish area. Chrzanowska attained a scholarship to the United States of America from 1946 until 1947.

In 1966 she was diagnosed with cancer and despite several operations (one being on 13 December 1966) the disease spread. Franciszek Macharski visited her on 12 April 1973 and gave her the Anointing of the Sick while she later lost consciousness on 28 April. Chrzanowska succumbed to the disease on 29 April 1973 in her apartment at 4:00am and the Cardinal Archbishop of Krakow Karol Józef Wojtyła – the future Pope John Paul II – celebrated her funeral. On 6 April 2016 her remains were exhumed for examination and were reburied on 7 April at a celebration that Cardinal Macharski presided over.

Honors

Chrzanowska received two prestigious honors in her lifetime in recognition of her good works:
 Odznaka honorowa „Za wzorową pracę w służbie zdrowia” (1957)
the Pro Ecclesia et Pontifice medal – received in 1965.
 the Order of Polonia Restituta (Knight's Cross) – received in 1971.

Beatification
The beatification process commenced in Poland on 28 April 1997 when the Congregation for the Causes of Saints granted their assent to the cause. The diocesan process spanned from 3 November 1998 until January 2003 and it saw the accumulation of documents and witness testimonies in order to collate work on her life and her exercise of the virtues. The C.C.S. validated this local process sometime later on 11 January 2008. The Positio was presented to Rome for further evaluation in 2011 and Pope Francis recognized that she had lived a life of heroic virtue thus proclaimed her to be Venerable on 30 September 2015.

The next step was for a miracle to be attributed to her for her beatification. One such case was investigated in Kraków and was validated in Rome on 21 May 2010. Pope Francis confirmed this miracle in mid-2017 and was beatified in Poland on 28 April 2018.

The current postulator for this cause is Father Antoni Sołtysik.

References

External links
 Hagiography Circle
 Saints SQPN
 Santi e Beati

1902 births
1973 deaths
20th-century venerated Christians
20th-century Polish people
Benedictines
Deaths from cancer in Poland
People in health professions from Warsaw
Polish Roman Catholics
Recipients of the Order of Polonia Restituta
Venerated Catholics by Pope Francis
Polish nurses
People from Warsaw
Polish beatified people
Benedictine beatified people
Beatifications by Pope Francis
Polish Benedictines
Benedictine oblates
Burials at Rakowicki Cemetery
Nursing education
Nursing educators
Nursing researchers
Nursing theorists